Opeongo River Provincial Park is a waterway park in Nipissing District in northeastern Ontario, Canada. It incorporates those portions of the Opeongo River from its exit from Algonquin Provincial Park to the river's mouth at the Madawaska River, except for a small portion around Victoria Lake. The park has two access points: from Ontario Highway 60 west of the community of Madawaska; and the Shall Lake access point, north of Victoria Lake, in Algonquin Provincial Park.

As a non-operating park, there are no facilities or services. The park can be used for recreational activities such as canoeing, hiking, swimming, and hunting.

References

Sources

External links

Provincial parks of Ontario
Parks in Nipissing District
Protected areas established in 1985
1985 establishments in Ontario